The 2003 Milwaukee Mile Centennial 250 was the sixth round of the 2003 CART World Series season, held on May 31, 2003 at the Milwaukee Mile in West Allis, Wisconsin.  The race was the first night race in CART history.

Qualifying results
The qualification session was rained out, so the grid was set by times from the first practice session, which was led by Alex Tagliani.  The usual point for pole was not awarded.

Race

Box Score

 Average Speed: 
 (1) indicates the point total includes 1 bonus polint for leading the most laps.

Caution flags

Lap Leaders

Total laps led

Standings after the race

 Note: Only the top five positions are included for the drivers' standings.

External links
 Full Weekend Times & Results

Milwaukee
Milwaukee Indy 225